Mohammad Sajid is a Pakistani former cricketer. He played in one List A match in 2001/02. He is now an umpire, and stood in the match between Rawalpindi and Habib Bank Limited in the 2017–18 Quaid-e-Azam Trophy on 3 October 2017.

References

External links
 

Year of birth missing (living people)
Living people
Pakistani cricketers
Pakistani cricket umpires
Place of birth missing (living people)
Lahore cricketers